Mussahi District (Pashto: د موسهي ولسوالی) (Persian:  ولسوالی موسهي) is a southern district of Kabul Province, Afghanistan. Mussai district borders Char Asiab District to the west, Bagrami District to the north, Khaki Jabbar District to the east and Logar Province to the south. Its headquarter is in Mussahi village, which is in the central part of the district.

Demography
It had a population of 30,000 people by the 2002 UNHCR official estimation. The Pashtuns form the majority of the population and there is distinctive Tajik population.

Mussahi district is located at the south of Kabul (25 km away from Kabul City) with fair road access (an hour car drive in rough road). Formerly being a part of Char Asiab district, it has been recognised as an independent district in 2001. The district is categorized as an agricultural area. The main agricultural production are wheat, onion, potatoes, tomatoes and fresh vegetable. Generally, farmers are also engaged in small-scale animal husbandry, keeping cows, sheep and chickens for self-consumption. This district consists of 67 villages. The main villages of this district are Shahid Khanh, Mayan Khail, Moussahi Di Kalan, Qultaghan, Qali Abrauof, Alo Khail, Payanda Khail, Qishlaql, Charso village, Haji Malang Baba, Chinoghundi, Rahmatabad, Chaman Qala and others . The Mussahi district has been almost fully destroyed during the wars, and like all districts of the country, is now going through a reconstruction.
The Logar River passes through this district and divides this district in two part (Bara Mussahi and Kuza Mussahi).

Security and Politics
It was reported Afghan and NATO forces arrested 12 militants accused of anti-government activities on 17 November 2009 in the district.

References

External links
 Mussahi District Map (Source: AIMS)
 thenational.ae/news

Districts of Kabul Province